A Regional Security Office is the office at a U.S. Embassy or Consulate that oversees all functions of security. It is headed by a special agent of the U.S. Diplomatic Security Service (DSS) who has the title of Regional Security Officer (RSO).

The employees of a Regional Security Office are responsible for the safety and security of all Americans at post. This includes managing security for official buildings, as well as residences.

Overview 
Within a Regional Security Office, and under its RSO, may be found Assistant RSOs, Office Management Specialists and other assistants. In addition, the Engineering Services Center/Office, and the Marine Security Guard detachment office, which report through the RSO, are considered to be sub-units of the Regional Security Office.

Fugitives 
The U.S. Diplomatic Security Service is the most widely represented law enforcement organizations in the world; it has the capability to track and capture fugitives who have fled U.S. jurisdiction to avoid prosecution. During 2009, DSS assisted in the resolution of 136 international fugitive cases from around the globe.

See also 
 Ramzi Yousef - captured by U.S. Diplomatic Security utilizing Rewards for Justice (RFJ)
 Rewards for Justice - money for information leading to the capture of terrorists, administered by U.S. Diplomatic Security

References

External links 
 REWARDS FOR JUSTICE - DSS - Money for Information leading to the capture of Terrorists
  BBC article on DSS
  Pamphlet - DSS: A Global Law Enforcement Agency
 OFFICIAL U.S. Diplomatic Security Website
 U.S. Diplomatic Security History Book
 U.S. Diplomatic Security Photo Gallery
 U.S. Diplomatic Security Pictorial History
 U.S. Diplomatic Security testifies before Senate's Homeland Security & Governmental Affairs Subcmte, SD-342
 U.S. Diplomatic Security's Assistant Secretary of State testifies before the Senate C-SPAN
 U.S. Diplomatic Security's Assistant Secretary of State testifies before the Senate on 6/29/2011 C-SPAN
 DS on C-SPAN
 Diplomatic Security Special Agents Association
 Diplomatic Security - Office of Foreign Missions
 Diplomatic Security WASHINGTON POST article
 Diplomatic Security - Mobile Security Deployments (MSD)
 1996 Secretary of State Warren Christopher presents awards for valor to DSS Special Agents - Transcript
 DS Special Agents at the Olympics
 CBS Evening News - DSS at the UN General Assembly 2009
 CBS Evening News - Diplomatic Security Behind the Scenes
 CBS NEWS 6 June 2011 - Keeping U.S. Officials Safe Overseas - DSS 
 CBS Evening News 22 Sept 2011 - DSS: Inside Hillary Clinton's Security Bubble
 AMW - America's Most Wanted Interview of RSO Rob Kelty - Diplomatic Security Service - 11 min. 15 sec. into the segment. Segment aired on February 27, 2010 on AMW
 AMW - America's Most Wanted - Behind the Scenes: Belize - DSS Special Agent (RSO) Rob Kelty interviewed by John Walsh
 Former DS Special Agent tells Fox News that radical Muslim cleric lied to qualify for U.S.- funded college scholarship
 VISA SECURITY - Stratfor.com
 DSS Special Agent Randall Bennett investigates Wall Street Journal reporter Daniel Pearl's murder
 DSS Segments/Clips
 DSS and America's Most Wanted
 Diplomatic Security 2010 Year in Review - Vigilant In an Uncertain World
 Defense Standard Magazine, Winter 2010 Pg 76, Diplomatic Security - ACTIVE DIPLOMACY
 PROVIDING FALSE INFORMATION ON PASSPORT APPLICATIONS LEADS TO FEDERAL PROSECUTIONS
 Diplomatic Security Service Protecting U.S. Officials Overseas
 U.S. Investigates Syrian Diplomats for Spying on Protesters - State Department may limit their travel
 Female DSS Agents in ELLE Magazine
 Marine Museum honors partnership between Corps' Security Guard Program & Department of State's Diplomatic Security Service
 DS/HSI-ICE: Authorities Bust Strip Club Operation that Illegally Employed Hundreds by the Mob
 U.S. Diplomatic Security in Iraq After the Withdrawal
 L.A. arsons: Federal agent tips helped lead to suspect's capture

Bureau of Diplomatic Security